Starspangledbanner is an Australian-bred and internationally raced Thoroughbred racehorse who won six of his sixteen group or listed race starts including the group one (G1) Golden Jubilee Stakes at Royal Ascot, G1 July Cup at Newmarket, G1 Oakleigh Plate and the G1 Caulfield Guineas for A$2,198,503 in prize money.

Breeding and background
He was foaled on 10 September 2006, and bred by Tony Santic's Makybe Racing & Breeding Pty Ltd. Starspangledbanner is by international race winner and successful sire, Choisir, his dam is the race winner, Gold Anthem who has produced five named foals for two other winners, by different sires. He was line bred to Star Kingdom in the fifth and sixth generations (5m x 6f) of his pedigree.

Starspangledbanner was offered for sale at the Inglis Premier Yearling Sale where he was auctioned and sold for A$120,000 with the breeder electing to retain a share in the new ownership.

Racing record
Starspangledbanner commenced racing in 2008. He won a total of five races from twelve starts in Australia and became the first group one winner for his sire Choisir.

In 2009 Starspangledbanner won his biggest race to date in the Caulfield Guineas. In that race he beat one of the strongest three-year -ld fields assembled in Australia in recent years, with the beaten runners including the subsequent Cox Plate quinella in So You Think and Manhattan Rain.

Starspangledbanner won the Oakleigh Plate at Caulfield in February 2010, the Golden Jubilee Stakes at Ascot in June 2010, and the July Cup at Newmarket in the following month. He failed to win at his next two starts and in November 2010 was retired from racing. Due to fertility issues, Starspangledbanner returned to training in late 2012. He finished second in the Renaissance Stakes run at the Curragh. He was retired from racing again in May 2013.

Stud record
Starspangledbanner was retired to Coolmore Stud in Ireland where his 2011 service fee has been set at €15,000. After his first season at stud, he was deemed to be sub fertile and sired only 63 foals after covering at least 160 mares. His sperm were abnormally formed and had reduced motility.

Notable progeny

c = colt, f = filly, g = gelding''

References

External links
Racing Victoria Limited (RVL): Starspangledbanner

2006 racehorse births
Racehorses bred in Australia
Racehorses trained in Australia
Racehorses trained in Ireland
Thoroughbred family 22-b